St Mary's Independent School, formerly named St Mary's College, was an independent day school for boys and girls in Southampton, Hampshire, England.

The school was located on the site of a former a country house called Bitterne Grove, built c1790 by Richard Leversuch. In 1910 it was bought by the French order of the Brothers of Christian Instruction and renamed as St Mary’s House. Initially it was a centre for students who were exiled from France due to anti-clerical laws passed there in 1903 and training for the Brotherhood, until the centre was relocated to Highlands College, Jersey, in the Channel Islands.

In 1922 it became the first Secondary School for Catholic boys in Southampton, under the name of St Mary’s College, and opened with five Brothers and 30 pupils. During the Second World War rapid expansion of the school took place; the number of pupils passing from 200 at the start of the War to 400 at the end. In 1992 the junior department started taking girls and in 2000 the senior department was opened to girls, and latterly approximately 25% of the pupils were girls. Former pupils are known as Old Simmarians.

From 1925 to 1964 Rev Brother Maurice worked at the school. Before WWI he had been sent as a teacher amongst the Blackfoot Indians in Montana and Eskimos on the Yukon River. During the war he served with great distinction in the French Medical Corps. He was twice wounded and also mentioned three times in dispatches for gallantry. He was awarded the Croix de Guerre with palm and two stars, as well as the Médaille Militaire and, for his bravery on the battlefield of Verdun in 1916, the Legion of Honour Military Medal. He was twice headmaster of St Mary’s (1928–31 and 1937–43) and later head of its prep-school, Charlton.

In 2013 Ofsted judged the school as 'Good'. In 2018 another inspection judged it to 'Requires Improvement'. In 2019 it was reinspected and judged 'Inadequate'.

In 2020 the school went into administration following financial difficulties which had been "significantly impacted" due to the coronavirus pandemic. The school was acquired and refurbished by private investors  and re-opened in Sept 2021 as a school for children aged 7–16 with social, emotional and mental health needs, under the new name of Yarrow Heights School.

Notable former pupils

 Roy Brindley, poker player, TV commentator, author
 Robert Chote, Chairman of the Office of Budget Responsibility
 Prof. Anthony R. Dickinson, Professor of Neuropharmacology, UCL
 Patrick Garland, writer, actor, theatre and film director
 Philip Hoare, writer, TV programme maker, journalist, Professor of Creative Writing at Southampton University
 Nick Holmes, former Southampton footballer, FA Cup winning team
 Richard May, a speedway rider who rode for Reading Racers and Poole Pirates between 1969 and 1977
 Andrew Surman, former Southampton and current Norwich City footballer
 John Sydenham, former Southampton footballer
 Sir Gerry Whent, CEO of Vodafone
 Richard George Deverell: became Director of the Royal Botanic Gardens, Kew in September 2012. He was previously Controller of CBBC

External links 
History of Bitterne Grove, with photos 
School Website - with archive images
St Mary's College at Good Schools Guide

References

Defunct schools in Southampton
Educational institutions established in 1922
Educational institutions disestablished in 2020
1922 establishments in England
2020 disestablishments in England